Lieutenant General Eedson Louis Millard "Tommy" Burns,  (June 17, 1897 – September 13, 1985) was a senior officer of the Canadian Army and a diplomat. He saw active service in both World War I and World War II. He served as the first commander of the first United Nations peacekeeping force in 1956.  His military career in war has, for the most part, been criticised by some historians as showing he was "simply incapable of commanding a higher formation."

Early life and military career
E. L. M. Burns was born on June 17, 1897, in Montreal, Quebec. His father was a militia staff officer, a member of the Corps of Guides. He served with the 17th Duke of York's Royal Canadian Hussars (17th D.Y.R.C.H.). He had risen to the rank of signal sergeant by 1913. "Tommy" Burns, student # 1032 graduated from the Royal Military College of Canada in Kingston, Ontario in 1914. He joined the Royal Canadian Engineers, into which he was commissioned as a second lieutenant in June 1915.

Burns served in Canada until March 1916 when he went overseas with the 3rd Canadian Division Signal Company which, was composed of engineers.
He fought on the Western Front with the Royal Canadian Engineers from 1916 to 1918. He became a staff officer with the 3rd Division's 9th Brigade in March 1917, dealing with supply and personnel and saw action at the Battle of Vimy Ridge. He became a "staff learner" and acted as liaison officer between forward battalions and brigade headquarters. He returned to Canada in 1919 and was stationed at St. John as an engineer officer. He was wounded twice during the war and also received the Military Cross.

Between the wars
After receiving a commission in the Permanent Force as a captain on 1 April 1920, Burns attended the School of Military Engineering, Chatham, England, for eighteen months. He was an instructor at the Royal Military College of Canada in Kingston, Ontario. He returned to Halifax and served on duty during the miners' strike at Glace Bay. He worked in the Survey Department in Ottawa. In 1924, he was appointed as an instructor at RMC in field engineering. He attended the Staff College, Quetta, in British India and returned to Quebec, Canada in 1930. In 1939, as a lieutenant colonel, he attended the Imperial Defence College in London, England.

World War II

During World War II Burns, promoted on 1 February 1942 to the temporary rank of brigadier, assumed command of the 4th Canadian Armoured Brigade, part of the 4th Canadian (Armoured) Division, which eventually went to England. Precisely fifteen months after his promotion to brigadier, he received another promotion, this time to major general, on 1 May 1943, when he became the bew General Officer Commanding (GOC) of the 2nd Canadian Infantry Division. The division had been severely mauled the year before during the disastrous Dieppe Raid.

He was not destined to lead the division into battle, however, as, throughout January 1944, there were several changes in the higher levels in command in preparation for the Allied invasion of Normandy in the spring. Lieutenant-General Ernest William Sansom, commanding II Canadian Corps, and under whose command Burns's 2nd Division was serving, was returned to Canada and replaced by Major-General Guy Simonds, returning to England from the Italian front where he had been GOC of the 5th Canadian (Armoured) Division. Burns himself handed over command of the 2nd Division to Charles Foulkes while Burns proceeded to Italy where he succeeded Simonds in command of the 5th Canadian (Armoured) Division on 23 January 1944. Not long after his arrival his superior, Lieutenant-General Harry Crerar, the commander of I Canadian Corps and who was soon to return to England to take over the First Canadian Army, had a high opinion of Burns and, believing him to be corps commander material, wanted Burns to succeed him as GOC I Canadian Corps.

That was all in the future, however. By the time of Burns's assumption of command, the division had been in Italy for just ten weeks. On 17 January the division's 11th Infantry Brigade, commanded by Brigadier George Kitching, had launched a disastrous assault over the Arieli River, which failed with heavy casualties. This aside, the division still possessed more battle experience than its new GOC, who, in this war, had never commanded even a company in battle, let alone an entire division. He therefore found himself in the same position that every Canadian divisional commander, the exceptions being Major-General John Hamilton Roberts, who had commanded the 2nd Division at Dieppe, Simonds, who before being GOC of the 5th Division had commanded the 1st Canadian Infantry Division in Sicily, along with Christopher Vokes, who succeeded Simonds in command of the 1st Division. Even Burns's superior, Crerar, had not had the chance to command the two divisions (the 1st and 5th) serving in his corps. The lack of battle experience mattered to the men who had successfully commanded units in battle before (such as at the recent Battle of Ortona, where Vokes's 1st Division had driven out German paratroopers, albeit at a heavy cost) and they were frustrated at an as-yet untested commander being given command of a newly arrived division. General Sir Bernard Montgomery, the former commander of the British Eighth Army (under whose control I Canadian Corps fell), placed experience in battle very highly, as did his successor in command of the Eighth Army, Lieutenant-General Sir Oliver Leese, a man with whom Burns was to clash with on several occasions over the following months.

As a result of this, Burns had a lot to prove, and he had to prove it quickly, in the eyes of both his superiors and subordinates alike. Leese, initially at least, liked what he saw of "Tommy" Burns, writing home to his wife in early March, "I think he will be good. I will be glad to get rid of Harry [Crerar] and get Burns installed & to get down to some degree of permanency." Lieutenant Colonel W. C. Murphy, the 5th Division's GSO1, also hoped for a permanent commander who would stay longer than a few weeks. He wrote to his family in early February, "General Burns has joined us. He is very nice to work with and all goes well from that angle. No doubt I'll find a general that I consider good enough to keep on the job one of these days. I hope we'll settle down with no more changes for a while because things always have to be adjusted a bit with each boss man's viewpoint."

Despite Murphy's wishes, change did arrive, as in late March, after receiving a promotion, this time to the acting rank of lieutenant-general on 20 March, Burns became GOC I Canadian Corps, taking over from Crerar, who was returning to England to take over command of the First Canadian Army. Crerar, who continued to think highly of Burns, wrote to Lieutenant-General Kenneth Stuart, the acting commander of the First Army in England as well as chief of staff at Canadian Military Headquarters (CMHQ), that, "Burns is showing up very well, indeed, and gives one a feeling of great confidence. Vokes [GOC 1st Division] has certainly reached his ceiling but, providing he is told very clearly what he is to do, and is guided, in his actions, from above, can be regarded as fit for the responsibilities of his appointment." Vokes was a tough officer who had commanded the 1st Division's 2nd Infantry Brigade throughout the fighting in Sicily and briefly in Italy but Montgomery believed that command of a division was his limit, which he probably told Crerar, who might well have been offended by Vokes's womanizing and almost constant cursing. As a result, Burns, to his surprise, found himself promoted to corps commander instead of Vokes.

Burns's performance as a corps-level commander proved to be controversial, despite the successes of the Canadian forces in the Italian campaign, and so he was replaced as commander of I Canadian Corps by Major-General Charles Foulkes.

Following this major setback to his career, Burns, reverting back to his permanent rank of major-general, was given another chance, and he was sent to Northwestern Europe in December 1944, becoming the Chief of Canadian Section, 1st Echelon, 21st Army Group, a position he held until September 1945, by which time the war, after six long years, had finally come to an end.

Later life

Burns served as Deputy Minister of Veterans’ Affairs. He served as a President of the UNAC during the 1950s. He played a critical role in the Middle East peace process from 1954 to 1959. He was instrumental in developing UN peacekeeping. As Chief of Staff in 1954, United Nations Truce Supervision Organization (UNTSO) was designed to maintain the General Armistice Agreements until permanent peace could be formulated.

Burns served as a Chief of Staff of the Truce Supervision Organization in Palestine (1954–56) and was thus nearby when the Suez Crisis of 1956 occurred. He then led UNEF as Force Commander from November 1956 to December 1959. He was Canada's principal disarmament negotiator from 1960 to 1968. he died in Manotick, Ontario at the age of 88.

Burns held the chair of Strategic Studies at the Norman Paterson School for International Affairs, Carleton University from 1969 to 1975. He wrote "Between Arab and Israeli" (1962); "General Mud: Memoirs of Two World Wars" (1970) and "Defense in the Nuclear Age" (1976).

Honours

Burns was awarded the Military Cross for maintaining communications under heavy fire, and, for the same action at the Somme, his non-commissioned officers received Military Medals.

In 1967 Burns was made a Companion of the Order of Canada for his services to Canada at home and abroad. He was described as a Former Chief of General Staff and Canadian adviser on disarmament in Geneva. In 1970, he received an honorary doctorate from Sir George Williams University, which later became Concordia University.

Burns was the 1981 recipient of the Pearson Medal of Peace for his work in the military of Canada. He is a 2010 induction to the Wall of Honour at the Royal Military College of Canada. There is also a park located in Nepean named after him.

A mannequin at the Royal Military College of Canada wears "Tommy" Burns' khaki army uniform jacket, covered with medals and wrapped with a Sam Browne belt.

The largest building at the Canadian Forces College is named Burns Hall, and his portrait is displayed at the entrance of the college.

References

Bibliography
Burns, Lieutenant-General E.L.M. (1962) Between Arab and Israeli. George G. Harrap.
 Johnston, Major JP. "ELM Burns–A Crisis of Command." (2006). online
 Lofgren, Second Lieutenant Will. "In Defence of “Tommy” Burns." (2006). online

External links

Eedson Louis Millard Burns at The Canadian Encyclopedia

Burns, E.L.M. General mud : memoirs of two World Wars. Toronto : Clarke, Irwin, 1970. 254 p.
Details of war service from ordersofbattle.com 
Concordia University Honorary Degree Citation, June 1970, Concordia University Records Management and Archives
Generals of World War II

|-

|-

|-

1897 births
1985 deaths
United Nations military personnel
Canadian diplomats
Canadian military personnel of World War I
Canadian generals
Companions of the Distinguished Service Order
Companions of the Order of Canada
Canadian recipients of the Military Cross
Canadian Officers of the Order of the British Empire
Military personnel from Montreal
Royal Military College of Canada alumni
Academic staff of the Royal Military College of Canada
Graduates of the Royal College of Defence Studies
Graduates of the Staff College, Quetta
Canadian Expeditionary Force officers
Canadian Army generals of World War II
Royal Canadian Engineers officers
Royal Canadian Hussars